Róbert Glenda (born 6 March 1986 in Nitra) is a Slovak football defender who currently plays for the Slovak 3. liga club FK Slovan Duslo Šaľa.

References

External links
 at fcnitra.sk 

1986 births
Living people
Slovak footballers
Association football defenders
FC Nitra players
FK Slovan Duslo Šaľa players
Slovak Super Liga players
Sportspeople from Nitra